Robert A. Riggle Jr. (born April 21, 1970) is an American actor, stand-up comedian, and retired United States Marine Officer.

Riggle is known for his work as a correspondent on Comedy Central's The Daily Show from 2006 to 2008; as a cast member on the NBC sketch comedy series Saturday Night Live from 2004 to 2005; as the recurring character Gil Thorpe on the 20th Television sitcom Modern Family from 2013 to 2019; and for his comedic roles in films such as Talladega Nights: The Ballad of Ricky Bobby (2006), The Hangover (2009), Furry Vengeance (2010), Larry Crowne (2011), Dumb and Dumber To (2014), Absolutely Anything (2015) and Night School (2018). He has also co-starred in the Adult Swim comedy-action series NTSF:SD:SUV::. In 2012, he replaced Frank Caliendo for the comedy skit and prognostication portions of Fox NFL Sunday. Riggle currently co-hosts the miniature golf game show series Holey Moley with Joe Tessitore on ABC.

Early life
Riggle was born in Louisville, Kentucky, the son of Sandra and Robert Allen Riggle, who worked in insurance. His family moved to Overland Park, Kansas when he was two. He attended Shawnee Mission South High School, where he was involved in the school's radio and TV stations. He was voted the most humorous in high school and graduated in 1988. He later attended the University of Kansas, where he was a member of the Phi Gamma Delta fraternity, attained his pilot's license, and graduated with a B.A. in Theater and Film in 1992. He went on to earn a Master of Public Administration degree from Webster University in 1997.

Military career

Riggle joined the Marines in 1990 after getting his pilot's license, intending to become a naval aviator, but left flight school to pursue a comedy career. Riggle was a member of the United States Marine Corps Reserve and often referred to his military experiences on The Daily Show, including acting as the show's "military analyst" and joking that he could kill any other member of the show. In August 2007, he went to Iraq to report for The Daily Show and to entertain troops under the purview of the USO.

Riggle was a public affairs officer with a New York City-based unit; he served in Liberia, Kosovo, Albania, and Afghanistan. He attained the rank of lieutenant colonel and received the Meritorious Service Medal (2); Navy and Marine Corps Commendation Medal; Joint Service Achievement Medal; Navy and Marine Corps Achievement Medal (2); Combat Action Ribbon (He earned it during his tour in Kosovo); National Defense Service Medal (2); Kosovo Campaign Medal; Afghanistan Campaign Medal; Global War on Terrorism Service Medal; Humanitarian Service Medal; Armed Forces Reserve Medal; and NATO Medal.

On January 1, 2013, he retired from the Marine Corps Reserve after 23 years of service.

Awards and decorations

Comedy career

Comedy partnership with Rob Huebel
Riggle has a long-standing comedic partnership with comedian Rob Huebel, with whom he frequently appears at the Upright Citizens Brigade Theater (UCBT) and in their former improvisational sketch comedy troupe Respecto Montalban. Perhaps the duo's best known creation was their long running two-man show Kung Fu Grip which they performed at UCBT and other comedy venues for many years, and in the 2004 HBO Comedy Arts Festival. Around this time, they began appearing together in several of Comedy Central and VH1's "talking head" commentary programs such as Best Week Ever and A2Z. They also appeared in Bravo network's 100 Scariest Movie Moments special in 2004. These appearances got the duo their first exposure to television viewers and made them favorites among VH1 viewers. Riggle, Huebel and most of their castmates from Respecto Montalban also performed in sketches on Late Night with Conan O'Brien through the late 1990s and early 2000s.

The duo's growing popularity landed them an audition on Saturday Night Live in the summer of 2004. They auditioned together, though only Riggle ended up making the cut. After spending one season on Saturday Night Live from 2004 to 2005, Riggle soon joined Huebel and many of his other Respecto Montalban castmates in Los Angeles to work on new projects. Soon after, the two landed a holding deal at NBC in early 2006 to develop a half-hour comedy program, though it never reached production.

In September 2006, Riggle joined The Daily Show as a regular correspondent. Around the same time, Huebel (along with Respecto Montalban member Paul Scheer and stand-up comic Aziz Ansari) started developing Human Giant, a sketch show for MTV. Riggle often appeared in the show's sketches, and in its 24-hour live marathon which aired in May 2007. One of Riggle's most memorable appearances was as hired muscle Ham-Bone, who appeared alongside Aziz Ansari in the season one sketch "Clell Tickle: Indie Marketing Guru". Riggle and Huebel can also be seen on stage at the UCBT in Doug Benson's documentary Super High Me.

Saturday Night Live
A featured player during the 2004–2005 season, Riggle's first appearance as a SNL cast member was on the show's 30th-season premiere on October 2, 2004. He has portrayed Larry the Cable Guy, Howard Dean, Rick Sanchez, Mark McGwire, and Toby Keith. He had a one-shot character named Leviticus, a loud, violent street preacher who only appeared on a Weekend Update segment on the Christmas episode hosted by Robert De Niro (though another sketch featuring Leviticus scheduled to air on the episode hosted by Hilary Swank was cut after dress rehearsal).

Prior to becoming a cast member, Riggle appeared in a non-speaking role during season 29 in a pre-taped parody of Fear Factor, where he played the father of one of the child contestants during the "Breakfast in Bed" challenge, in which a child must eat the maggots off a plate of Eggs Benedict with the understanding that failing to do so results in the divorce of his parents.

The Daily Show
In September 2006, Riggle joined the cast of The Daily Show to replace the departing Rob Corddry, and his debut on September 20, 2006.

TV Guide cited Riggle's segment "Marines in Berkeley" where he donned hippie regalia to spoof University of California, Berkeley peace activists protesting a local Marines recruiting station.

During the 2008 Olympics, Riggle traveled to China to tape sketches for The Daily Show, producing the four-part special feature "Rob Riggle: Chasing the Dragon".

Riggle left The Daily Show on December 10, 2008, in his words "to go fight crime"; however, he appeared at Bonnaroo 2009—with John Oliver and Rory Albanese, one of the show's executive producers—in a show entitled An Evening (or Afternoon) with The Daily Show featuring John Oliver, Rob Riggle & Rory Albanese.

On August 3, 2010, Riggle made a surprise cameo on The Daily Show during an interview with Will Ferrell. While Ferrell and Stewart began discussing Riggle's "lack of talent" and making other disparaging remarks about him, Riggle suddenly walked onto the set to "surprise" them and asked if they were talking about him. His intimidating presence appeared to make Ferrell and Stewart visibly afraid, continuing the running joke that Stewart is afraid of Riggle.

Stand-up comedy

Previously, Riggle's live comedy work was mostly improvisational and sketch-based, but beginning in 2006 he wanted to try something different and decided to create a stand-up act. After working on it in various comedy clubs in New York City, he toured colleges and other comedy clubs, often performing with John Oliver and other Daily Show writers. He credits John Oliver for encouraging him to try stand-up while they shared an office at The Daily Show.

Riggle hosted an episode of Comedy Central's stand-up series Live at Gotham on December 4, 2009, and taped a Comedy Central Presents special that aired on March 5, 2010.

Other work
Riggle played Eddie Reynolds in Blackballed: The Bobby Dukes Story, a 2004 film starring Rob Corddry, and featuring almost all of the Respecto Montalban group. Later that year Riggle was one of the "Flab Four" on the Comedy Central mini-series Straight Plan for the Gay Man, a parody of Queer Eye for the Straight Guy that ran for three episodes.

In 2006, Riggle guest-starred as a boat captain named Captain Jack on the "Booze Cruise" episode of The Office, and as an anti-euthanasia activist on Arrested Development. He was also seen as a NASCAR announcer in the comedy film Talladega Nights with Will Ferrell.

In late 2007, Riggle began appearing as a spokesman in a series of Budweiser commercials. In 2008 he signed a talent holding contract with CBS and CBS Paramount Network TV, which included a development deal to create and star in a half-hour comedy series. He also gained a supporting role in Step Brothers, where he plays a rude co-worker of Brennan's (Will Ferrell). He had memorable supporting roles in the 2009 films The Hangover and The Goods: Live Hard, Sell Hard, and supporting roles in the 2010 comedies Going the Distance, Killers, and The Other Guys.

In 2009, Riggle started a recurring role on the CBS sitcom Gary Unmarried, playing Mitch, Jay Mohr's brother from the Marines.

In 2010, Riggle and comedian Paul Scheer wrote and starred in "Designated Driver", a series of sketches for the first season of the HBO comedy show Funny or Die Presents. Riggle, Scheer and Rob Huebel also wrote and starred in a series of sketches called "Death Hunt" in the show's second season in 2011.

For the 2010–2011 NFL football season, Riggle recorded a Monday Night Football introduction and several short comedy bits for the Kansas City Chiefs to be played at Arrowhead Stadium in Kansas City, Missouri. He played the lead in the 2011 CBS sitcom pilot Home Game, executive produced by Mark Wahlberg.

Riggle is seen in stadium monitors at Qwest Field during Seattle Seahawks games, encouraging fans to cheer.

In May 2011, Riggle appeared in a 2-minute short on funnyordie.com as the U.S. Navy SEAL who killed Osama bin Laden. He plays a humble US Navy Lieutenant (though the insignia on his uniform displays three solid gold bands, indicating the O-5 rank of a USN commander) who, upon being awarded the Distinguished Service Cross, pledges absolute discretion, then gets intoxicated at a local bar and boasts unreservedly to a large crowd that he was bin Laden's assassin.

From 2011 to 2013, Riggle has co-starred as "The President of the Navy" in the Adult Swim comedy-action series NTSF:SD:SUV::. On July 11, 2012, he hosted the 2012 ESPY Awards.

In 2012, Riggle had a recurring role as "Kevin Jesquire" in season two of the FX comedy series Wilfred. He also began the recurring role of Gil Thorpe, the real-estate rival of Phil Dunphy (played by Ty Burrell), on the hit comedy series Modern Family, which continued through the show's 11th and final season in 2020.

In October 2013, he played Satan in the music video for Steel Panther's "Party Like Tomorrow is the End of the World".

In 2014, he was expected to star with Rob Lowe in the pilot for the single-camera comedy The Pro as Bobby Welch, a former professional tennis player. but the series was not picked up. Riggle appeared as Frank West in the 2015 film Dead Rising: Watchtower.

In August 2016, Riggle appeared at the Comedy Central Roast of Rob Lowe.

From September 2016, Riggle took over the role of Colonel Sanders in the KFC ad campaigns, following other comedians including Norm Macdonald and Darrell Hammond.

Riggle has been co-hosting on Stephen Curry's miniature golf game show Holey Moley in 2019 thru 2021 seasons  with Joe Tessitore.

In 2023, Riggle voiced Glorlox, an alien bounty hunter and recurring character in My Dad the Bounty Hunter.

Fox NFL Sunday
Beginning with the 19th-season premiere of the Fox NFL Sunday pre-game show on September 9, 2012, Riggle took over the comedy skit and prognosticator portions previously performed by Frank Caliendo from 2003 to 2011. Riggle did not return to the Fox NFL pre-game show in 2020.

Personal life
Riggle married his wife Tiffany on April 13, 1999, and have two children. They filed for divorce in October 2020.

In June 2021, Riggle publicly claimed that his ex-wife had hacked his personal Apple account, stolen money from his home, and that she was somehow spying on him. Later that month, Riggle was granted a temporary restraining order against his ex-wife after finding a hidden camera, disguised as a smoke detector, in his home with more than 10,000 videos stored in it — some of which support his claims. A second hearing was scheduled for July 2021 at Riggle's request for a forensic expert to go through the footage obtained through the hidden camera.

Filmography

Film

Television

See also

References

External links

 Rob Riggle Official website
 Rob Riggle at Comedy Central's The Daily Show
 

1970 births
Living people
American male film actors
United States Marine Corps personnel of the War in Afghanistan (2001–2021)
American stand-up comedians
American male television actors
American television writers
United States Marine Corps personnel of the Kosovo War
American impressionists (entertainers)
American sketch comedians
American male voice actors
Male actors from Kansas
Male actors from Louisville, Kentucky
American male television writers
People from Overland Park, Kansas
University of Kansas alumni
United States Marine Corps colonels
United States Marine Corps reservists
Webster University alumni
20th-century American male actors
21st-century American male actors
Screenwriters from Kansas
Screenwriters from Kentucky
20th-century American comedians
21st-century American comedians
Australian game show hosts
Recipients of the Humanitarian Service Medal